This is a list of breweries, wineries, and distilleries in the state of Utah.

As of 2013, eighteen breweries were operating in the state. As of September 2022, this number had increased to 40, ranking 42nd in the total number of breweries and 48th in per capita number of breweries, with 1.4 per 100,000 people of age 21 and over. However, Utah is 32nd in the total number of craft beer barrels produced, and 28th in gallons per capita.

There are also 23 distilleries and 15 wineries currently operating in Utah.

Breweries

Distilleries

Wineries

See also 
 Beer in the United States
 List of breweries in the United States
 List of microbreweries
 Alcohol laws of Utah

References

External links
 https://www.beeradvocate.com/place/city/82/

 
Utah
Utah
Utah
Utah
Utah
American cuisine-related lists
Food and drink companies based in Utah
Breweries